Jared Ward (born September 9, 1988) is an American long distance runner. He qualified for the 2016 Summer Olympics when he placed third in the marathon at the 2016 US Olympic Trials. He finished sixth at the 2016 Olympics.

Early life, family and education

Jared Ward was born in Layton, Utah. His sister Anna and her husband are also competitive runners.

Ward has a master's degree in statistics from Brigham Young University.

Career
In addition to his athletic career, Ward teaches statistics at BYU as a member of the adjunct faculty.

Running career

Collegiate
While in college, Ward ran for the BYU Cougars. Ahead of the 2013 NCAA DI Cross Country Championships, Ward lost eligibility due to running a local fun run in a costume.

Professional
Ward was the runner-up at the 2014 U.S. Marathon championships. At the 2015 USATF 25 km Championships Ward finished 1st defeating Matt Llano, Christo Landry, Abdi Abdirahman, Augustus Maiyo, and Brett Gotcher.  At the 2015 USATF 20 km Championships Ward finished 1st defeating Dathan Ritzenhein, Luke Puskedra, Tyler Pennel, Abdi Abdirahman, and Fernando Cabada.  Ward is also the 2015 U.S. Marathon champion.  These three victories helped him secure the USATF Running Circuit title for 2015.

On February 13, 2016 Ward finished third, behind Galen Rupp and Meb Keflezighi at the US Olympic Marathon Trials in Los Angeles, California, to secure a place on the 2016 US Olympic Team, finishing in 2:13:00 on a warm day. On August 21, 2016 Ward finished 6th, with Galen Rupp in 3rd and Meb Keflezighi in 33rd, at the Olympic Marathon in Rio de Janeiro, Brazil, running a personal best time of 2:11:30 with the temperature in the 70s on a drizzly, humid morning.

Personal life
Ward and his wife Erica have four children. They reside in Provo, Utah.

Ward is a member of the Church of Jesus Christ of Latter-day Saints. He took a two-year mission to Pittsburgh, Pennsylvania.

Competition record

USA National Championships

Road

NCAA championships

References

External links 

 
 

Living people
American male long-distance runners
American male marathon runners
Olympic track and field athletes of the United States
1988 births
People from Layton, Utah
Sportspeople from Provo, Utah
Track and field athletes from Utah
Brigham Young University faculty
Brigham Young University alumni
BYU Cougars men's track and field athletes
BYU Cougars men's cross country runners
Latter Day Saints from Utah
American Mormon missionaries in the United States
Athletes (track and field) at the 2016 Summer Olympics